Bogusze may refer to the following places:
Bogusze, Bielsk County in Podlaskie Voivodeship (north-east Poland)
Bogusze, Sokółka County in Podlaskie Voivodeship (north-east Poland)
Bogusze, Warmian-Masurian Voivodeship (north Poland)

See also
Bogusz, a surname